Paradox Addendum is an EP by The Crüxshadows released in 2000.

It features two remixes of "Heaven's Gaze" and one remix of "Cruelty" from the previously released full-length The Mystery of the Whisper. The track "Eurydice" features on 2001's Intercontinental Drift.

Track listing
 "Love/Tragedy"
 "Cruelty" (Cruel Night version)
 "Eurydice (Don't Follow)"
 "Heaven's Gaze" (Bitter Tears mix)
 "Ave Maria"
 "Heaven's Gaze" (OB-1 House Gazing)
 "Annabel Lee" (spoken)

Also includes QuickTime "Cruelty" video.

Credits 
 Guitar – Kevin Page
 Keyboards, Technician [Analog Modeling] – Chris Brantley
 Keyboards, Violin – Rachel McDonnell
 Recorded By, Mastered By – Rogue
 Vocals, Programmed By, Sequenced By – Rogue

References

The Crüxshadows EPs
2000 EPs